Carmen Canta Sambas is an album by Portuguese-born Brazilian samba singer Carmen Miranda, released in 2007 by EMI Brazil.

Track listing

References

External links 
 Carmen Canta Sambas at Allmusic

Portuguese-language albums
Carmen Miranda albums
2007 albums
EMI Records albums
Albums published posthumously